Chuncheon Polytechnic College is a vocational training institution located in Chuncheon City, the capital of Gangwon province, South Korea.  The current president is Yeom Si Hwan.

Academics

Chuncheon Polytechnic offers technical training courses through its departments of Materials Science, Computer-aided Mechanics, Electricity, Electronics, Industrial Design, and Multimedia.

History
The school was founded in 1973 as Chuncheon Vocational Training Institute, operated by the South Korean Ministry of Labor. It was reorganized as a polytechnic college offering the bachelor's degree in 1996.

See also
Education in South Korea
List of colleges and universities in South Korea

External links
Official school website, in Korean

Vocational education in South Korea
Universities and colleges in Gangwon Province, South Korea
Korea Polytechnics
Chuncheon
Educational institutions established in 1973
1973 establishments in South Korea

ko:한국폴리텍3대학